The Chugai' Pictograph Site is a prehistoric rock art site on the island of Rota in the Northern Mariana Islands.  The rock art is located in a limestone cave on the southeastern side of the island, in the I'Chenchon Bird Sanctuary.  It consists of a large panel,  in length, of about 90 painted drawings, believed to be of late pre-contact origin.  The site is accessed via a trail cut by the Japanese during the South Seas Mandate period.

The site was listed on the National Register of Historic Places in 1998.

See also
 National Register of Historic Places listings in the Northern Mariana Islands

References

National Register of Historic Places in the Northern Mariana Islands
Rota (island)
Rock art of Oceania